Tipton High School is a public high school located in Tipton, Indiana.

Athletics
Tipton High School's athletic teams are the Blue Devils and they compete in the Hoosier Athletic Conference. The school offers a wide range of athletics including:

Baseball
Basketball (Men's and Women's)
Cheerleading
Cross Country (Men's and Women's)
Soccer (Men's and Women's)
Football
Golf (Men's and Women's)
Softball
Swimming (Men's and Women's)
Tennis (Men's and Women's)
Track and field (Men's and Women's)
Volleyball
Wrestling

Golf
The 1993-1994 Men's Golf team won the IHSAA Boys Golf State Championship.

Softball
The 1989-1990 Women's Softball team won the IHSAA Women's Softball State Championship

Notable alumni

 Sara L Gall, 2021 Prom Queen
 Abbie C Riddle, 2021-2022 Drum Major

References

See also
 List of high schools in Indiana

Buildings and structures in Tipton County, Indiana
Schools in Tipton County, Indiana
Public high schools in Indiana